{{Infobox song
| name     = Dixieland
| cover    = Dixieland, by Tex Grant, performed by Winifred Atwell, record label, 1954.jpg
| alt      = Record label
| caption  = 'Dixieland, composed by Tex Grant, performed by Winifred Atwell, Philips record label, 1954
| type     = song
| artist   = 
| album    =
| released = 
| format   =
| recorded = 1954
| studio   =
| venue    =
| genre    = Dixieland jazz
| length   =
| label    = 
| composer = Tex Grant
| lyricist = 
| producer =
}}
"Dixieland" is a 1954 Dixieland jazz composition by Tex Grant.

The composition was published by Francis, Day & Hunter Ltd. in 1954. It was released as a single of 2 minutes 0 seconds in length, with Sorry Robbie'' by Bert Weedon on the B-side in 1960.

It has been performed and recorded by other artists and bands including Winifred Atwell in 1954 and the Oxcentrics.

See also
 Dixieland jazz

References

1954 compositions
Jazz compositions
Dixieland jazz standards